Tarrazú is the fifth canton in the province of San José in Costa Rica.  The head city of the canton is San Marcos. It is part of Los Santos Zone, together with Dota and León Cortés Castro.

Geography 

The Pirrís  River (also known as Parrita River) establishes much of the northern boundary of the three-pronged canton, which reaches south across the Coastal Mountain Range to its border with the canton of Aguirre in Puntarenas Province.

Districts
The canton of Tarrazú is subdivided into three districts:

 San Marcos
 San Lorenzo
 San Carlos

History
The canton was established by a legislative decree of 7 August 1868. It was part of the Desamparados canton by that time.

Demographics 

Transportation

Road transportation 
The canton is covered by the following road routes:

Economy
Highland coffee is the main source of income of local people. However, tourism and avocado production are of increased importance. During the months of December, January and February, population increases three-fold due to harvest time. San Marcos, the biggest town in the region, has become the center of economic activity.
More recently the Costa Rican Institute of Electricity has invested millions of dollars in the Pirris Hydro Dam, scheduled to start generating energy by March 2011. The Hydro Dam is now the highest structure of its kind in Central America and will be key to the economic development of the region, not only in the highlands but the coastal regions of Quepos and Parrita.

The region is deeply dependent on remittances from emigres who live in the United States, namely New Jersey.  Few households in the region do not have a family member who lives and works in the United States.  Ironically, this outmigration has led to an influx of thousands of Panamanian laborers to help realize the annual coffee harvest.  
Tarrazu, particularly the San Lorenzo area, is felt to produce the most desirable coffee in Costa Rica. Finca Palmilera coffee is grown here. In November 2012, it was the most expensive coffee sold in Starbucks coffee shops in the United States.

References

Cantons of San José Province